Orthaga polyscia is a species of snout moth in the genus Orthaga. It was described by Turner in 1913. It is found in Australia.

References

Moths described in 1913
Epipaschiinae
Endemic fauna of Australia